Isabelle Morin (born February 14, 1985) is a Canadian politician, who represented the Quebec riding of Notre-Dame-de-Grâce—Lachine in the House of Commons of Canada under the banner of the New Democratic Party from May 2011 to November 2015. She defeated the local long-time liberal MP Marlene Jennings by more than 4,000 votes in the 2011 federal election.

Morin has a diploma in literature from Cégep François-Xavier Garneau in Quebec City and a bachelor of education from the Université de Sherbrooke. During her university studies, she was executive vice-president of the students’ federation (FEUS) and sat on the board of directors of the Fédération universitaire du Québec. In 2007 she co-founded Vélorution, an organization promoting the rights of bicyclists in Sherbrooke.

Before becoming a politician Morin taught French and drama at the secondary school Cavelier-De LaSalle. She also taught at the adult education 'Centre Louis-Jolliet' and 'Centre Saint-Michel' and the 'Centre de détention Sherbrooke' on rue Talbot.

Prior to being elected Member of Parliament, Morin took part in various humanitarian missions abroad and visited more than 25 countries including Guatemala where she learnt a lot about fair trade. While travelling she came to appreciate the importance of intercultural exchange and cooperation.

Parliamentary work

As the Official Opposition's deputy critic for Seniors, Morin fought to restore the retirement age from 67 to 65. She also served as the NDP critic for animal welfare and was president of the NDP Youth Caucus.

Moreover, since 2011 Morin has served as a member of the Standing Committee on Transport, Infrastructure and Communities. Her work in this role focused, in particular, on road, bridge and aviation safety. Deeming this issue one of her key priorities, Morin urged the Conservative government of Stephen Harper via Bill C-305 to adopt a national strategy on transport in 2012. She has been involved in numerous initiatives including federal funding for the new Champlain Bridge as well as considerable investments in the infrastructure in her riding of Notre-Dame-de-Grâce—Lachine.

Morin also pays close attention to environmental issues in her constituency be it air or water quality or noise pollution. Most notably, she has been a strong advocate for the preservation of Dorval Municipal Golf Course, whose green space is facing destruction due to the decision of the Airport of Montreal (ADM) to repurpose the land for new screening facilities. Morin has been supporting the Save Our Green Space campaign launched by local citizens. She tabled several petitions in the House of Commons, sent a letter to federal Transport Minister Lisa Raitt and participated in a demonstration on Parliament Hill to draw the government's attention to the problem.

Since acting in her role as MP for Notre-Dame-de-Grâce—Lachine Morin has spoken out on various issues in the House of Commons:

- Dismantling of postal services and reduction of home delivery by Canada Post;

- Human trafficking;

- The conservative government's budget cuts for aerospace industry and employment insurance;

- Lack of coherent legal framework concerning animal rights.

2015 general election

Morin was defeated in the 2015 election by Liberal Anju Dhillon.

Electoral record

 

Source: Elections Canada

References

External links
Official website

1985 births
French Quebecers
Members of the House of Commons of Canada from Quebec
New Democratic Party MPs
Living people
People from Lachine, Quebec
Politicians from Montreal
Politicians from Quebec City
Women members of the House of Commons of Canada
21st-century Canadian politicians
21st-century Canadian women politicians